Arichibald 'Alan' Sprouster (1910-1968) was an Australian rugby league footballer who played in the 1930s.

Archibald 'Alan' Sprouster played one season of first grade with the St George Dragons in 1933, and he played in the Grand Final of that year.

He finished his career at Junee, New South Wales in the late 1930s.

References

Australian rugby league players
St. George Dragons players
1910 births
1968 deaths
Rugby league second-rows
Rugby league players from Sydney